Saint Romanus Ostiarius is a legendary saint of the Catholic Church.  His legend states that he was a soldier who converted to Christianity by the example of Saint Lawrence, who baptized Romanus after the soldier was imprisoned.  He became a church ostiary in Rome and was later martyred.

External links

Colonnade Statue in St Peter's Square

3rd-century Christian martyrs
Year of birth unknown
Corsican saints